is an American physician. Yano is a former child prodigy and has an estimated IQ of 200.

Life and education
Yano's mother, Kyung, is originally from South Korea, while his father, Katsura, is originally from Japan.  Yano reportedly was reading by age two, writing by age three, playing classical music on the piano at age four, and composing by age five. He went to the Mirman School as a child. After scoring 1500 out of 1600 on the SAT at age eight, he graduated from the American School of Correspondence at age nine  then entered Loyola University Chicago also at age nine, graduating summa cum laude at age 12. He then entered the Pritzker School of Medicine at the University of Chicago in the MSTP (Medical Scientist Training Program), which is designed for those seeking to earn an MD and PhD. He was awarded a doctorate in molecular genetics and cell biology there in 2009, at the age of 18.  He entered his third year of medical school at the University of Chicago in 2009, becoming at age 21 the youngest person to graduate with an MD from the University of Chicago, for which he has been called a "real-life Doogie Howser". He became a pediatric neurology resident at the University of Chicago.

According to Yano, he owes much of his success to his mother, who noticed his superior intellectual capabilities at an early age and helped encourage and motivate him through rigorous academic enrichment. His mother also homeschooled him through the 12th grade, saying she felt other students his age would not be as interested in their studies.  Sho's younger sister Sayuri (born 1996) also exhibits prodigious talents in both academic studies and music; she graduated Roosevelt University in 2010 with a Bachelor of Science in biology degree. She later became a B.M. student majoring in violin performance at the Peabody Institute of The Johns Hopkins University.

See also
 Balamurali Ambati
 Michael Kearney

References
Specific

General
 Psychology, Themes and Variations. Fourth Canadian Edition. By Wayne Weiten and Doug McCann. Chapter 9, Intelligence and Psychological Testing; Giftedness.

External links
Sho's coauthored research article, from BMC Evolutionary Biology
His mother writes book on experience, sister joins Sho at college 
Graduate gets his PhD at age 18
12-year-old begins medical school at University of Chicago
IQ200 한국계 18세 천재소년 박사학위
Sho playing on From the Top NPR
Sho Yano's radio essay
Meet Chicago's Sibling Geniuses

1990 births
Living people
American physicians of Japanese descent
American physicians of Korean descent
American people of South Korean descent
Loyola University Chicago alumni
Pritzker School of Medicine alumni
Physicians from Portland, Oregon
Year of birth uncertain
21st-century American physicians